The 2007 MLS SuperDraft was held in Indianapolis, Indiana on January 12, 2007.  It was the eighth annual Major League Soccer SuperDraft. The first selection belonged to expansion team Toronto FC.

The SuperDraft was followed by the 2007 MLS Supplemental Draft.

Player selection
Any player whose name is marked with an * was contracted under the Generation Adidas program.

Round one

Round one trades

Round two

Round two trades

Round three

Round three trades

Round four

Round four trades

Notable undrafted players 
 Kenny Schoeni

See also 
 Draft (sports)
 Generation Adidas
 Major League Soccer
 MLS SuperDraft

References 

Major League Soccer drafts
SuperDraft
MLS SuperDraft
MLS SuperDraft
Soccer in Indiana
Sports in Indianapolis
Events in Indianapolis
MLS SuperDraft